There & Back: Ashley Parker Angel is a MTV reality television series which ran for ten weeks in early 2006. It chronicled the efforts of former O-Town member Ashley Parker Angel to launch a solo career while providing for his new family. In the show, Ashley must manage his career while also having to provide for his fiancée, Tiffany Lynn, and his new son, Lyric (whose birth was the first shown on MTV). The show debuted on January 9, 2006, and ended on March 13, 2006.

Episode list

Season 1

External links
There and Back (TV series) on MTV.com

MTV original programming
2000s American reality television series
2006 American television series debuts
2006 American television series endings